This is a list of films produced in the French cinema, ordered by year and decade of release on separate pages.

Before 1910
List of French films before 1910

1910s

 List of French films of 1910
 List of French films of 1911
 List of French films of 1912
 List of French films of 1913
 List of French films of 1914

 List of French films of 1915
 List of French films of 1916
 List of French films of 1917
 List of French films of 1918
 List of French films of 1919

1920s

 List of French films of 1920
 List of French films of 1921
 List of French films of 1922
 List of French films of 1923
 List of French films of 1924

 List of French films of 1925
 List of French films of 1926
 List of French films of 1927
 List of French films of 1928
 List of French films of 1929

1930s

 List of French films of 1930
 List of French films of 1931
 List of French films of 1932
 List of French films of 1933
 List of French films of 1934

 List of French films of 1935
 List of French films of 1936
 List of French films of 1937
 List of French films of 1938
 List of French films of 1939

1940s

 List of French films of 1940
 List of French films of 1941
 List of French films of 1942
 List of French films of 1943
 List of French films of 1944

 List of French films of 1945
 List of French films of 1946
 List of French films of 1947
 List of French films of 1948
 List of French films of 1949

1950s

 List of French films of 1950
 List of French films of 1951
 List of French films of 1952
 List of French films of 1953
 List of French films of 1954

 List of French films of 1955
 List of French films of 1956
 List of French films of 1957
 List of French films of 1958
 List of French films of 1959

1960s

 List of French films of 1960
 List of French films of 1961
 List of French films of 1962
 List of French films of 1963
 List of French films of 1964

 List of French films of 1965
 List of French films of 1966
 List of French films of 1967
 List of French films of 1968
 List of French films of 1969

1970s

 List of French films of 1970
 List of French films of 1971
 List of French films of 1972
 List of French films of 1973
 List of French films of 1974

 List of French films of 1975
 List of French films of 1976
 List of French films of 1977
 List of French films of 1978
 List of French films of 1979

1980s

 List of French films of 1980
 List of French films of 1981
 List of French films of 1982
 List of French films of 1983
 List of French films of 1984

 List of French films of 1985
 List of French films of 1986
 List of French films of 1987
 List of French films of 1988
 List of French films of 1989

1990s

 List of French films of 1990
 List of French films of 1991
 List of French films of 1992
 List of French films of 1993
 List of French films of 1994

 List of French films of 1995
 List of French films of 1996
 List of French films of 1997
 List of French films of 1998
 List of French films of 1999

2000s

 List of French films of 2000
 List of French films of 2001
 List of French films of 2002
 List of French films of 2003
 List of French films of 2004

 List of French films of 2005
 List of French films of 2006
 List of French films of 2007
 List of French films of 2008
 List of French films of 2009

2010s

List of French films of 2010
List of French films of 2011
List of French films of 2012
List of French films of 2013
List of French films of 2014

List of French films of 2015
List of French films of 2016
List of French films of 2017
List of French films of 2018
List of French films of 2019

2020s 
 List of French films of 2020
 List of French films of 2021
 List of French films of 2022
 List of French films of 2023
 List of French films of 2024
 List of French films of 2025
 List of French films of 2026
 List of French films of 2027
 List of French films of 2028
 List of French films of 2029

Alphabetical list
 See :Category:French films

See also

 Lists of films
 List of French erotic films
 List of French-language films
 List of years in France
 List of years in French television
 List of films set during the French Revolution and French Revolutionary Wars